Christopher Burke (born 1967) is a British writer on typography and a typeface designer.

Burke worked at Monotype before earning a PhD in Typography & Graphic Communication at the University of Reading in 1995.

From 1996 to 2001 he taught at the University of Reading, where he planned and conceived the MA in typeface design.

He is probably best known for his 1998 book on the typographer Paul Renner.

Burke's typefaces include Celeste, Celeste Sans, Parable and Pragma.

Works
 Burke, Christopher, Paul Renner: The Art of Typography, Hyphen Press, 1998. 
 Burke, Christopher, Active Literature: Jan Tschichold and New Typography, Hyphen Press, 2007. 
 Neurath, Otto (edited by Matthew Eve & Christopher Burke), From Hieroglyphics to Isotype: A Visual Autobiography, Hyphen Press, 2010.

References

External links
 Interview with Christopher Burke online at Hyphen Press

British non-fiction writers
British typographers and type designers
Design writers
British male writers
1967 births
Living people
Academics of the University of Reading
Place of birth missing (living people)
Date of birth missing (living people)
Male non-fiction writers